Elections to Sefton Metropolitan Borough Council were held on 4 May 2000. The whole council was up for election with boundary changes since the last election in 1999 reducing the number of seats by three. The council stayed under no overall control.

Election result

References

2000 English local elections
2000
2000s in Merseyside